Ernesto Balmaceda Bello (1887 – February 24, 1906) was a Chilean diplomat, who was murdered in Belgium in a celebrated case that came to define diplomatic privileges and immunities for the retinue and families of diplomatic staff. He was of Basque descent.

Early life
He was born in Santiago, the son of José Rafael Balmaceda Fernández and of Ana Bello Codesido. By birth, he was the son of a former Minister of the Interior, great-grandson of Andrés Bello and nephew to President José Manuel Balmaceda. After completing his secondary studies, he joined the Chilean Foreign Service and in 1905 was appointed secretary of the Chilean consulate in Brussels.

The murder
His immediate superior at the consulate in Brussels was charge d'affaires Don Luis Waddington, who had two children: Adelaida and Carlos. Soon after his arrival, Balmaceda started to court Adelaide and shortly thereafter, the parents of the bride-to-be found out that the young couple already had had sexual intercourse. They then demanded that 19-year-old Ernesto become engaged to Adelaide and "redress the wrong done" to her. He admitted his error and accepted the engagement for the time being.

Balmaceda did not want to get married, so he wrote to his family to have himself immediately transferred to another embassy. His family connections managed his transfer to the embassy in the United States, but before he could depart the news leaked, and 16-year-old Carlos Waddington, brother of his bride-to-be started to practice target-shooting in the embassy gardens under his window. Ernesto Balmaceda panicked and on February 24, 1906, the day when the engagement was to be publicly announced at an embassy banquet, he hid in his rooming-house, with his friend Javier Rengifo. Carlos visited him and demanded that he honor his word. When Balmaceda refused, he shot him three times: once in the heart, once in the chest and once in the head.

After the murder, Carlos Waddington fled to the Chilean embassy and claimed diplomatic immunity and extraterritoriality. The Belgian people were incensed at this behavior and surrounded the embassy, bent on capturing Waddington. The police had to establish a constant cordon in order to prevent the mob from violating the building and lynching him. On March 2, Chile waived its rights and ordered Waddington to be handed over to the Belgian police to stand trial.

By the time the trial happened, public opinion had shifted in Waddington's favor, and he was viewed as the avenger of his sister's honor. After a very short trial, he was acquitted on July 6, 1907.

Additional information

See also
Balmaceda family

References

External links
The New York Times: "SLAIN BY DIPLOMAT'S SON" (February 25, 1906)
The New York Times: "LYNCHERS BESIEGE LEGATION" (February 26, 1906)
The New York Times: "GIVES UP DIPLOMAT'S SON" (March 3, 1906)
The New York Times: "DIPLOMAT'S SON ON TRIAL FOR MURDER" (June 25, 1907)
The New York Times: "DIPLOMAT'S SON DEFENDS CRIME" (June 30, 1907)
The New York Times: "PARIS SYMPATHIZES WITH WADDINGTON" (July 1, 1907)
The New York Times: "WADDINGTON CASE READY FOR JURY" (July 3, 1907)
The New York Times: "SYMPATHY FOR WADDINGTON" (July 5, 1907)
The New York Times: "WADDINGTON ACQUITTED" (July 6, 1907)
The International and Comparative Law Quarterly: "Diplomatic Privileges and Immunities: The Retinue and Families of the Diplomatic Staff" by Clifton E. Wilson (October 1965)
Brief overview of case, rather biased 

1887 births
1906 deaths
Andrés Bello
Assassinated Chilean people
Chilean diplomats
Chilean people murdered abroad
Chilean people of Basque descent
Honor killing in Europe
Honor killing victims
People from Santiago
People murdered in Belgium
Violence against men in Europe